Ferdino Rebello (born 31 August 1949), is an Indian jurist, former Chief Justice of the Allahabad High Court, former judge of the Bombay High Court, and a former Member of the Legislative Assembly of Goa, Daman and Diu.

Education
Rebello completed his LL.B. from the Government Law College, Mumbai and thereafter practiced in the High Court of Bombay at Goa. He also was a lecturer in law at the Salgaonkar Law College from 1975–1977.

Career
Rebello was the president of  Goa High Court Bar Association from 1984 to 1996 and was designated a Senior Advocate in 1995. He was elected to the Legislative Assembly of Goa in 1977 on a Janata Party ticket. In 1989, he unsuccessfully contested and lost parliamentary elections on a Janata Party ticket to Eduardo Falerio and has been inactive in politics ever since.

References

20th-century Indian judges
Living people
Judges of the Bombay High Court
Chief Justices of the Allahabad High Court
1949 births
Members of the Goa Legislative Assembly
Janata Party politicians
People from Vasco da Gama, Goa